LANDR Audio is a cloud-based music creation platform developed by MixGenius, an artificial intelligence company based in Montreal, Quebec. Since launching with its flagship automated mastering service in 2014, LANDR has expanded its offerings to include distribution services, a music samples library, virtual studio technology (VSTs) and plug-ins, a service marketplace for musicians, and online video conferencing.

History
MixGenius launched an automated mastering service in 2014 under the name LANDR, meant to represent the left and right audio channels. The engine, developed through several years, was built by analyzing thousands of mastered tracks and by doing research and analysis on the workflows of mastering engineers. The engine performs the standard mastering processes, such as equalization, dynamic compression, audio excitement or saturation, and limiting/maximizing.

The company, now mainly referred to as LANDR Audio, continues to add services to their platform with the goal of bridging the gap between DIY musicians and the professional music market under CEO Pascal Pilon.

LANDR has also created educational materials to help musicians improve their music production skills. Their educational content is disseminated through their blog, social media, and YouTube channel.

Product timeline 

 2014: AI mastering
 2017: Music distribution
 2018: Music samples library
 2019: Rent-to-own VSTs and plug-ins
 2020: Collaboration tools & services marketplace
 2021: Proprietary VSTs and plug-ins

Products and services

AI Mastering 
Traditional music mastering is a post-production process by which a mastering engineer cleans up and normalizes and audio track to achieve a uniform and consistent master recording from which copies can be reliably made. The LANDR AI engine recreates this process to produce release-ready masters that conform to both physical and digital distribution quality standards.

The LANDR engine analyzes uploaded tracks and creates a mastering chain catered to the style and genre of that track. Users can then use presets or choose to customize their masters using various settings and features. Users can also choose the file format of their final master or master in batches for consistent sound across multi-track releases. The engine offers various output formats, though WAVs are the standard choice for music distribution.

Music distribution 
LANDR Distribution allows users to release and monetize their music on digital streaming platforms like Spotify, Apple Music, and TikTok. LANDR users can currently distribute to 70 digital service providers (DSPs) and aggregators resulting in a full stable of over 150 digital streaming stores and platforms. LANDR has also been named a preferred partner of both Apple Music and Spotify since 2020.

Audio samples 
The curated library hosts over one million samples from various third-party providers and is updated weekly with new content. 

The Samples marketplace also hosts AI-led tools to help users search and preview samples in context. Selector suggests complementary samples to users as they browse. Creator, a browser-based audio interface, allows users to preview and play with samples while they browse the library. Tracks made with Creator can also be shared directly to TikTok.

In 2021, LANDR launched a proprietary Samples plug-in to allow users to browse and preview the Samples library from within their preferred digital audio workstation (DAW).

VSTs & plug-ins 
LANDR hosts a variety of free, subscription-based, and rent-to-own VSTs and plug-ins for DAWs. The rent-to-own program allows users to pay a monthly fee over a set period of time before owning their product license outright.

Network and marketplace 
Aimed at music professionals and DIY creators alike, the LANDR Network service marketplace allows users to create profiles, upload music, and connect with fellow artists and professionals to buy and sell their services. It also offers online collaboration tools like Sessions, video conferencing that allows users to sync and share DAW audio, and Projects, a collaborative, online workspace.

Reception
LANDR won the Technovation Award at Canadian Music Week in 2014 and has continued to grow in popularity since. The company was number 18 on CNBC's February 28, 2017 edition of their "Upstart 25" lists.

In a Pitchfork feature about mastering, Jordan Kisner noted that responses from users of LANDR were mixed, reasoning that they found the site's technology to not be "flexible or intelligent" and that "You get what you pay for: a computer algorithm, rather than a live engineer with taste and experience." However, despite hesitancy from the community to embrace artificial intelligence in music production spaces, LANDR received positive feedback from industry leaders like Bob Weir (Grateful Dead), Tiga, and Nas. Notably, the engine was utilized by Gwen Stefani’s team at the 2016 Grammys, cementing its place as a professional audio production tool.

As of April 2021, LANDR maintains a 4.4 ("Excellent") average rating on Trustpilot.

References

Music industry
Music production
Music production companies
Music production software
Music promoters
Services marketing
Music streaming services
Audio engineering
Sampling (music)